Caleb, sometimes transliterated as Kaleb (Kalev, ; Tiberian vocalization: Kālēḇ; Hebrew Academy: Kalev), is a figure who appears in the Hebrew Bible as a representative of the Tribe of Judah during the Israelites' journey to the Promised Land.

A reference to him is also found in the Quran, although his name is not mentioned (Al-Ma'idah: 20–26).

Name
According to The Jewish Encyclopedia, "since 'Caleb' signifies dog, it has been thought that the dog was the totem of a clan". The New American Standard Exhaustive Concordance states that the name Kaleb (Caleb) is related to the word for "dog". The Bible was written down centuries before Hebrew diacritics were introduced, and there is no certain knowledge of how the name was pronounced when the biblical text was written.

In Modern Hebrew, the name is pronounced ; the modern English pronunciation  is a result of the Great Vowel Shift.

An alternate Hebrew meaning offered for Caleb is "faithful, zealous, ruthless, bold, brave". This is on the basis of its being actually a compound word, a phenomenon quite common in ancient Hebrew. Col (Kaf + Lamed) = "all" or "whole"; Lev (Lamed + Bet) means "heart". Therefore, Caleb (or Calev as pronounced in Hebrew) would actually mean "whole-hearted" or "single-minded" or perhaps "fanatical". This might be due to the personal qualities of the Biblical Caleb, a companion of Moses and Joshua.

Biblical account
Caleb, son of Jephunneh  (Book of Numbers) is not to be confused with Caleb, great-grandson of Judah through Tamar. This other Caleb was the son of Hezron, and his wife was Azubah.

Their task, over a period of 40 days, was to explore the Negev and surrounding area, and to make an assessment of the geographical features of the land, the strength and numbers of the population, the agricultural potential and actual performance of the land, settlement patterns (whether their cities were like camps or strongholds), and forestry conditions. Moses also asked them to be courageous and to return with samples of local produce.

In the Numbers 13 listing of the heads of each tribe,  reads "Of the tribe of Judah, Caleb the son of Jephunneh." Caleb's report balanced the appeal of the land and its fruits with the challenge of making a conquest.

 of chapter 13 reads "And Caleb stilled the people toward Moses, and said: 'We should go up at once, and possess it; for we are well able to overcome it. Caleb and Joshua said the people should trust God and go into the land; the other ten spies, being fearful and rebellious, argued that conquering the land was impossible and immoral.

Caleb as a Kenizzite
Caleb the spy is the son of Jephunneh. Jephunneh is called a Kenizzite. The Kenizzites are listed as one of the nations associated with the land of Canaan at the time that God made a covenant with Abraham. However, Caleb is mentioned alongside the descendants of Judah recorded in : "And the sons of Caleb the son of Jephunneh: Iru, Elah, and Naam; and the sons of Elah: Kenaz". , likewise, lists Caleb as a tribal leader in Judah. Contrarily, the Kenizzites are also generally associated with Kenaz, the son of Esau, making them an Edomite clan (see ).

Deeds
In the aftermath of the conquest, Caleb asks Joshua to give him a mountain in property within the land of Judah, and Joshua blesses him as a sign of God's blessing and approval, giving him Hebron. Since Hebron itself was one of the Cities of Refuge to be ruled by the Levites, it is later explained that Caleb actually was given the outskirts. Caleb promised his daughter Achsah in marriage to whoever would conquer the land of Debir from the giants. This was eventually accomplished by Othniel Ben Kenaz, Caleb's nephew, who became Caleb's son-in-law as well.

1 Samuel  states that Nabal, the husband of Abigail before David, was "a Calebite" (Hebrew klby). It is not stated whether this refers to one of the Calebs mentioned in the Bible, or another person bearing the same name.

Traditional Jewish accounts

Traditional Jewish sources record a number of stories about Caleb which expand on the biblical account.

One account records that Caleb wanted to bring produce from the land, but that the other spies discouraged him from doing so in order to avoid giving the Israelites a positive impression of Canaan. They only agreed to carry in samples of produce after Caleb brandished a sword and threatened to fight over the matter. A Midrash refers to Caleb being devoted to the Lord and to Moses, splitting from the other scouts to tour Hebron on his own and visit the graves of the Patriarchs. While in Canaan with the spies, Caleb's voice was so loud that he succeeded in saving the other spies by frightening giants away from them.

Islam 
Caleb is referenced indirectly in the Quran and some scholars consider him to be one of the Prophets of Islam, though this is debated.

References

Bibliography

 
 
 Ginzberg, Louis (1911). Legends of the Jews: Bible Times and Characters From the Exodus to the Death of Moses (Volume III). Philadelphia: The Jewish Publication Society of America.
 
 NAS Exhaustive Concordance, "Keleb", accessed 9 June 2017

External links

 
The Jewish Encyclopedia, 1908
Gili Kugler, Who Conquered Hebron? Apologetic and Polemical Tendencies in the Story of Caleb in Josh 14

Tribe of Judah
Book of Numbers people